Webster is an unincorporated community in Webster Township, Rice County, Minnesota, United States.

The community is located at the junction of Rice County Roads 3 and 5.  Porter Creek flows through the community.

Nearby places include Lonsdale, Veseli, Hazelwood, and Elko New Market.

Webster is located within ZIP code 55088.  The boundary line between Rice and Scott counties is near Webster.

References

Unincorporated communities in Minnesota
Unincorporated communities in Rice County, Minnesota